Chain Lightning is an album by American singer-songwriter Don McLean. It was recorded in Nashville between June and August 1978 and featured many of that city's noted session players as well as backing vocals from The Jordanaires. It was first released in December 1978 in the UK and other markets, but not released for another two years in the US following its delayed success in European markets. The lead single "Crying" became a major hit for McLean, reaching No.1 in the UK Singles Chart in June 1980. The album was subsequently repackaged and released in the US where it also became a success with "Crying" reaching the top five in early 1981. "Since I Don't Have You" was also released as a single, reaching #23.

Track listing
All tracks composed by Don McLean, except where indicated.

"Words and Music" - (3:06)
"Crying" (Roy Orbison, Joe Melson) - (3:35)
"It's Just the Sun" - (2:30)
"Lotta Lovin'" (Bernice Bedwell) - (2:07)
"Chain Lightning" - (7:48)
"Your Cheatin' Heart" (Hank Williams) - (3:04)
"Wonderful Night" - (3:01)
"It Doesn't Matter Anymore" (Paul Anka) - (3:02)
"Since I Don't Have You" (Wally Lester, Joe VerScharen, Janet Vogel, Lenny Martin, Joseph Rock, James Beaumont, Jackie Taylor) - (2:31)
"Genesis (In the Beginning)" - (4:48)
"It's a Beautiful Life" - (2:11)
"If You Could Read My Mind" - (Gordon Lightfoot)

Charts

Weekly charts

Year-end charts

Personnel
Don McLean - vocals, acoustic guitar
James D. Capps, Ray Edenton - acoustic guitar
Tommy D. Allsup, Billy R. Sanford - electric guitar
Pete Drake - pedal steel guitar
Hargus "Pig" Robbins, Chuck Cochran - piano
Bobby R. Wood - electric piano
Bob "King" Moore - bass
Jerry K. Carrigan - drums, percussion
Joseph E. "Gene" Chrisman, Eddy Anderson - drums
The Jordanaires - backing vocals
The Nashville Strings - strings
Bill Justis - arrangements, conductor

Sales and certifications

References

Don McLean albums
1978 albums
Casablanca Records albums
Albums arranged by Bill Justis
Albums produced by Larry Butler (producer)